{{DISPLAYTITLE:C9H9NO4}}
The molecular formula C9H9NO4 (molar mass: 195.17 g/mol) may refer to:

 L-Dopaquinone, also known as o-dopaquinone
 Pencolide
 Salicyluric acid

Molecular formulas